Sylvan–Lucas USD 299 is a public unified school district headquartered in Sylvan Grove, Kansas, United States.  The district includes the communities of Sylvan Grove, Lucas, Luray, Hunter, Denmark, Vesper, Ash Grove, and nearby rural areas.

Schools
The school district operates the following schools:
 Sylvan-Lucas Unified Jr/Sr High School, in Sylvan Grove
 Lucas-Sylvan Unified Elementary School, in Lucas

See also
 Kansas State Department of Education
 Kansas State High School Activities Association
 List of high schools in Kansas
 List of unified school districts in Kansas

References

External links
 

School districts in Kansas